Phyllobotryon is a genus of flowering plants belonging to the family Salicaceae.

Its native range is Nigeria to Tanzania and Angola.

Species
Species:

Phyllobotryon bracteatum 
Phyllobotryon lebrunii 
Phyllobotryon maikoense 
Phyllobotryon paradoxum 
Phyllobotryon spathulatum

References

Salicaceae
Salicaceae genera